Wally Pleasant is an American musician from Michigan. He plays humorous songs based on folk music and 1950s–60s rock and roll influences. Throughout the 1990s he was a fixture in the East Lansing indie-rock scene, alongside fellow local acts like The Verve Pipe.

Career
Born Wally Bullard in Detroit, Pleasant did not become a serious guitarist until college.  While majoring in political science at Michigan State University's James Madison College, he performed at various Lansing-area open mic nights, gaining significant local popularity.

A successful homemade cassette tape in the late 1980s led him to release a total of six CDs, the first five on his own record label Miranda Records. His classic 1992 "Songs About Stuff" LP featured fan favorites like "Small Time Drug Dealer" and "Psycho Roommate."

In 1996, Pleasant performed before incumbent-President Bill Clinton's speech during his re-election campaign when he visited East Lansing. 

Pleasant has performed throughout the United States over the years, especially in areas where large numbers of MSU Spartan alumni have settled.  For much of the 1990s, he was a full-time musician, but has scaled back his schedule in recent years due to personal and family concerns.

He has been a featured artist on the Dr. Demento radio show with songs like "The Day Ted Nugent Killed All the Animals".  Nugent had Pleasant perform this song on Detroit radio in the mid-1990s.

Primarily a solo artist, Pleasant performed occasionally in the 1990s with individual sidemen (electric guitarists, bassists) and with a four-piece band, The Happy Neighborhood.  In 2003 and 2004 Pleasant also played with a backup band, Appearing as "Wally Pleasant and Carl". Carl was composed of former Turdcutter band members Eric Sweeney (drums) and David Wellbaum (bass).

In a 1997 Daily Vault review of Pleasant's 1992 college radio favorite Songs About Stuff, Sean McCarthy wrote:

Wally's most recent work includes writing and performing the music for Biggby's most recent commercial spots, winning an Emmy for his work in 2011.

2004's Music For Nerds & Perverts was released on  Nashville, Tennessee-based Spat! Records. His most recent LP, "Exile in Wally Street" followed in 2011.

Wally is married and currently lives in Charlotte, Michigan.

Discography

Albums
Songs About Stuff – 1992
Welcome To Pleasantville 1993
Houses of the Holy Moly – 1994
Wally World – 1996
Hoedown – 2000
Music For Nerds And Perverts – 2004
Happy Hour – 2018
Exile on Wally Street – 2011 (projected, still timely albeit revised release date)

References

External links

Spat! Records Wally's current label
Miranda Records
Antifolk Online article about Wally Pleasant
Lyrics to some of Wally Pleasant's more popular songs

Year of birth missing (living people)
Living people
Michigan State University alumni
American comedy musicians
People from East Lansing, Michigan
Singers from Detroit
People from Charlotte, Michigan
Singer-songwriters from Michigan